I Am Curious (Blue), whose original Swedish title, Jag är nyfiken – en film i blått, translates as "I Am Curious – A Film in Blue," is a 1968 Swedish film directed by Vilgot Sjöman and starring Lena Nyman as a character named after herself. It is a companion film to 1967's I Am Curious (Yellow); the two were initially intended to be one 3½ hour film. The films are named after the colours of the Swedish flag.

Blue is a second version of Yellow, taking place before and after the first film. It has a more somber and bitterly satiric style, and a further explication of the framing narrative. Questions of lesbianism, religion and critiques of meritocracy are discussed.

Lena Nyman won the award for Best Actress at the 5th Guldbagge Awards for her role in this film and I Am Curious (Yellow).

Plot
After the actress Lena had a sexual relationship with Börje, whose affairs with other women caused her to hate him and question her commitment to Martin Luther King Jr.'s philosophy of nonviolence, she continues to explore her sexuality and politics. She befriends a woman named Sonja, and they travel to Ströms Vattudal where they enjoy nude swimming and other excursions. While hiking, Lena also looks into a cabin and sees two women having lesbian sex. Lena returns to Stockholm, where she stays with the couple Hans and Bim. Bim notices Lena scratching herself, which Lena attributes to allergies. After Hans and Bim have an argument, Hans visits Lena in her bedroom. Bim enters with a magnifying glass and insists at looking at Lena's hand. She discovers Lena has scabies, disproving Lena's belief her constant itching owed to allergies and mosquito bites.

Lena approaches Börje in the car dealership where he now works, to inform him about the possibility that he also has scabies. He confirms he has been itching and accuses her of giving him the disease, citing her sexual promiscuity. She argues back he is just as promiscuous, resulting in a highly public heated argument. After he loses his job, they both head to the clinic for treatment.

References

External links
 
 
 Sex and Politics: An Interview with Vilgot Sjöman Conducted by John Lahr
Still Curious an essay by Gary Giddins at the Criterion Collection

1968 films
1960s Swedish-language films
Films directed by Vilgot Sjöman
Films set in Stockholm
Films shot in Sweden
1968 drama films
Swedish black-and-white films
Swedish avant-garde and experimental films
1960s avant-garde and experimental films
Self-reflexive films
Obscenity controversies in film
Film controversies in Sweden
Swedish erotic drama films
1960s Swedish films